Front Street Historic District, in Prestonburg, Kentucky, is a  historic district located roughly Front St. between W. Court St. and Ford Street.  It was listed on the National Register of Historic Places in 1989.  It included six contributing buildings.

It included:
Hughes Building (1927)
Combs Building (c. 1920s)
Elizabeth Hotel Building 
Odd Fellows Building
Auxier Hotel Building (1930), a three-story hotel
Richmond Building (1914), built of red brick as home of I. Richmond Company Department Store

References

Historic districts on the National Register of Historic Places in Kentucky
Chicago school architecture in Kentucky
National Register of Historic Places in Floyd County, Kentucky
Commercial buildings on the National Register of Historic Places in Kentucky
Prestonsburg, Kentucky